Mi Saw U (also known as Min Saw U) was a Pagan princess, who was queen of two kings, Kyawswa of Pagan and Thihathu of Pinya, and mother of two kings, Uzana I of Pinya and Kyawswa I of Pinya. Saw U was a daughter of Narathihapate, the last sovereign king of Pagan. Married to her half-brother Kyawswa, Saw U was pregnant with Kyawswa's child (Uzana) in December 1297 when she was seized by Thihathu who had just overthrown Kyawswa. Thihathu raised Uzana as his own child and later selected him as heir apparent. Saw U also gave birth to Thihathu's child, also named Kyawswa. Both Uzana and Kyawswa went on to become kings of Pinya. Her youngest son Nawrahta defected to the Sagaing Kingdom c. 1349 after a disagreement with his brother Kyawswa.

References

Bibliography
 
 
 
 

Pagan dynasty
Myinsaing dynasty
Pinya dynasty
13th-century Burmese women
14th-century Burmese women